The 2021 Judo Grand Slam Kazan was held at the TatNeft Arena in Kazan, Russia from 5 to 7 May 2021.

Medal summary

Men's events

Women's events

Source Results

Medal table

Event videos
The event was aired freely on the IJF YouTube channel.

References

External links
 

2021 IJF World Tour
2021 Judo Grand Slam
Judo
Judo Grand Slam